Guadalupe Martínez de Bejarano was a Mexican serial killer, who at the end of the 19th century, brutally murdered 3 girls. The press of her time dubbed her "The Fearsome Bejarano" or "La Mujer Verdugo".

She was one of the first serial killers in the history of Mexico (contemporary to Felipe Espinosa, Francisco Guerrero Pérez and Rodolfo Fierro), she was the first female serial killer that was recorded in Mexico. She was an organized killer, hedonistic motivated by sexual satisfaction, sedentary and sexual predator.

Biography
Not much is known about Martínez's private life, only that she was married to a man named Bejarano, and that with him she had at least one child: Aurelio Bejarano Martínez. She belonged to a high or medium-high social stratum (she can be sensed by her modus operandi).

Crimes
Martínez attracted her victims, young men and poor girls, by offering them employment as a servant in her home. She would take them home, already installed, and show her true intentions: she enslaved them and subjected them to torture with marked sexual overtones. She especially enjoyed forcing them to sit naked on a burning brazier (Roman chair), she also used to hang them naked by the dolls, with a rope that went to the ceiling, she suspended them and then she whipped them with a whip to herd cattle. Finally, she let them starve.

Victims
Casimira Juárez: Girl murdered in 1887 and was the first known crime of Martínez. She was apprehended and convicted of this crime, but the weak criminal legislation of the time only sentenced her to a few years in prison.
Guadalupe and Crescencia Pineda: Two sisters who were murdered in 1892. Martínez had just been released from prison, after only having spent 5 years in prison.

Condemnation and death
The police arrested Guadalupe after several complaints that spoke about possible people kidnapped and tortured in her home. But it was too late, the Pineda sisters were dead after weeks or perhaps months of abuse.

In the end, it was her own son who sank her by identifying her as the person responsible for the kidnappings, humiliations and deaths of the girls. La Bejarano defended herself by blaming her son for everything, but they did not believe her.

Public outrage demanded the death penalty for the Executioner Woman, however, she was sentenced to the laughable sentence of 10 years and 8 months. Aurelio Bejarano was also sentenced to 2 years in prison for his inaction in the face of the events.

Guadalupe Martínez was confined in the Belén prison for women, her confinement was spent alone in the face of the threat posed by the other inmates, who hated her for her terrible crimes, where she died of natural causes before she was sentenced of it is fulfilled.

Artworks inspired by her
Despite the terrible nature of her crimes, the name of Guadalupe Martínez de Bejarano has been forgotten over time, to the point of being very little known today. Although in her time her case raised a stir and inspired engravers and composers:

The engraver José Guadalupe Posada published several illustrations on the case, these are currently the most recognized. The writer and editor Antonio Vanegas Arroyo, for her part, composed the "Corrido de La Temible Bejarano".

See also
List of serial killers by country
List of serial killers by number of victims

References

Mexican female serial killers
Serial killers who died in prison custody